Ágnes Németh (born 22 September 1961) is a Hungarian basketball player. She competed in the women's tournament at the 1980 Summer Olympics.

References

External links
 

1961 births
Living people
Hungarian women's basketball players
Olympic basketball players of Hungary
Basketball players at the 1980 Summer Olympics
Sportspeople from Veszprém County
FIBA Hall of Fame inductees